Thompson is a primarily residential community in San Antonio, Texas. Thompson is a collection of individual residential areas that were developed independently over a wide span of time. The area is the gateway to Port San Antonio and saw heaviest development during the 1940s, 50s and 60s. Many residents and families in the community were once stationed at or otherwise employed at the former Kelly AFB which gives the area its strong working-class and military tradition.

History

The Thompson moniker originates from Thompson Place, the primary east–west thoroughfare.

The history of Thompson is fundamentally tied to the history of the former Kelly Air Force Base and now Port San Antonio. Kelly helped many of the areas residents by giving them higher-wage jobs that otherwise would have been inaccessible, allowing the area to achieve a slightly higher affluence than the surrounding area.

Neighborhoods

Single family neighborhoods
Aiken Farms
Brentwood Village
The Enclave at Summerhill
The Grotto
Jamar Village - Located across Gen. McMullen from Kennedy High and Kennedy Park, the village sprung from the need for housing for the booming Kelly AFB during the 1960s.  The neighborhood follows a more traditional grid layout with streets running east–west from Jamar Blvd to Imperial Blvd.
Los Jardines - Developed in 1989 by Gordon Hartman Homes, the Los Jardines neighborhood is a collection of 84 garden homes.  Residents are known as Jardineros, the Spanish word for gardener.
Jesusita - Developed in 1997 the Jesusita neighborhood was the last multiple-home development in Thompson Field.
Menefee
Parkers Garden
Wescott Place

Apartment living
In addition to Billy Mitchell, the Thompson community offers several rental options for those interested in apartment living.  Complexes include Darby Place, The Diplomat Apartments, Kennedy Arms, Roselawn Apartments, Thompson Place Apartments and Winston Square.

The Colonel J. George Cisneros Apartments are an assisted living community operated by the San Antonio Housing Authority.

Education

Day care
The community is served by several small, independent day care centers.

Primary education
Approximately 90% of Thompson is served by the Edgewood Independent School District.  The northeastern tip is serviced by the San Antonio Independent School District .

The area is home to John F. Kennedy High School, Brentwood Middle School and Norman Winston Elementary, all Edgewood schools. Edgewood's Frank Mata Memorial Stadium is located in Thompson, adjacent to Kennedy High School.  The Stadium serves as the home of Kennedy's Mighty Rocket Football team and is used for various other athletic and non-athletic events throughout the year.

The community is also home to St. John Berchmans School. The school is a parochial, coed, Catholic elementary functioning under the auspices of St. John Berchmans Catholic Church. School and church alike are operated by the Archdiocese of San Antonio.  The school serves PK-8 and is one of the largest elementary schools operated by the Archdiocese.

Colleges
Immediately south of the neighborhood, across General Hudnell, is St. Philips College-Southwest Campus.  The campus serves a vital role as the city's primary center for technical and industrial education. The campus serves approximately 2,000 students each semester and provides instruction and training for careers in high-skill, high-wage fields such as aviation technology, railroad operations and architectural drafting. Southwest Campus serves as a center linking welfare recipients and displaced workers to area opportunities, including those available with employers at Port San Antonio.  The Southwest Campus aids in creating a much-needed, high skilled workforce for the area.

Culture and life

The community is serviced by several national food chains as well as several local, independent restaurants.  

Rocky's Taco House is a local institution and hang out spot, especially on weekends and after Kennedy Football games.

Tellez Tamales is a local tamaleria that has served the community for decades.  It is well known in the area for its Mexican breakfast foods including tamales, barbacoa and other standard Mexican fare.

Tuby's Pool Hall is the only pool hall and bar in the community and the only one for several miles around the area.

Much as with the rest of Texas, Thompson residents have a strong affinity for high school football.  During the high school football season residents will regularly fill Mata Stadium on Friday and Saturday nights to watch Kennedy's football team take on opponents from across the San Antonio region.

Parks and Recreational Space
Kennedy Park
A  public park at the intersection of Roselawn Avenue and South General McMullen Drive.  The park includes the Kennedy Softball Complex which has five fields used for tournament and league play.  The park also includes a pool, several pavilions basketball and tennis courts, and half a mile of hard-surface walking trails. 
Lindbergh Park
Located at the intersection of Duncan Drive and Crickett Drive on the grounds of Port San Antonio.

Mateo Camargo Park
Popular among residents for events ranging from large birthday parties to music festivals and car shows.  The  park is located along the Highway 90 Access Road, just west of the Callaghan intersection.

Roselawn Memorial Park
The cemetery has been renamed San Fernando Catholic Cemetery No.3 and currently functions under the Archdiocese of San Antonio.

Port San Antonio
Thanks to the numerous on base facilities maintained for the military, Port San Antonio is littered with numerous small recreational areas including ball fields, running tracks and pavilions.

Economy

Employers in the area include: Boeing, Lockheed Martin, EG&G, General Electric and Gore Design.

As the area was developed before the spread of the suburban strip-mall, Thompson Field lacks the large stripcenters common in other parts of the city.  Only two strip centers currently exist in the community, the rest of the area is full of small, stand-alone businesses. Kelly Center, a small strip area on Billy Mitchell Blvd, once full of thriving local businesses has seen its fortunes go south with the exodus of workers from Kelly.

Transportation
The community is home to an office of the Texas Department of Public Safety  at the intersection of South Gen. McMullen and Weir Ave.

The proposed Austin–San Antonio Commuter Rail will terminate with a station south of the neighborhood at Port San Antonio.

Demographics
The area population was approximately 8,000 as of the 2000 Census.  The median age is 29 and approximately 10.1% of the population holds a college degree.

Approximately 89.9% of area residents are native born and 10.1% being of foreign origin.  Of those born outside the United States approximately 90% were born in Latin America.

The median household income was $23,114 and the median family income was $25,754.  The median homevalue was $47,000.

References

External links 

 St John Berchmans School
 Catholic Cemeteries of SA

Neighborhoods in San Antonio